Kermit Smith Jr. (June 7, 1957 – January 24, 1995) was an American convicted murderer who was executed by the state of North Carolina for the kidnap, rape, and murder of a 20-year-old college cheerleader. At the time of his execution, The New York Times and Associated Press noted he was just the second white person to be executed for the murder of a black victim since the death penalty was reinstated in 1976.

Crime
On December 4, 1980, 23-year-old Kermit Smith Jr. of Roanoke Rapids, North Carolina was taken into custody for the murder of 20-year-old Whelette Collins and the abduction of two other women after a basketball game the previous night at North Carolina Wesleyan College in Rocky Mount, North Carolina.

The two surviving abductees, both age 19, told officers they were forced at gunpoint into the trunk of the car near Wesleyan's gymnasium, while Collins was forced to ride in the passenger seat from Rocky Mount to Weldon, North Carolina. Smith took the women to a wooded area where he raped and bludgeoned Collins to death.

The two surviving abductees escaped Smith after attacking him with a lug wrench and a straightened-out safety pin. The women hid in the woods until morning when they were picked up on Interstate 95 by a passing motorist who stopped a North Carolina State Highway Patrol officer, who notified local authorities.

When police arrived with the women at the scene hours later, they found Smith still there in bloody clothing. The women identified him and he was arrested on the spot. Collins's body was found nearby.

Trial
On April 29, 1981, Smith was sentenced to death in Halifax County, North Carolina. In addition to death, he was sentenced to 40 years for rape and 10 years for robbery. Smith told reporters that he regretted his actions, but claimed he did not understand the significance of them due to stress. He further stated he was not particularly ready to die, but faced with spending the rest of his life in prison, he preferred the alternative.

A diary Smith kept that was later recovered showed that he had long planned the crime, motivated by misogyny and hatred of women. He had previously served time for a violent attack on a couple, noting in his diary that he had intended on kidnapping the woman and taking her into the woods. In that case, Smith got an 18-month suspended sentence and three years probation for assault.

In 1982, Kermit Smith was additionally sentenced to 25 years in prison for the kidnappings as part of a plea bargain.

Execution
On January 24, 1995, Smith was executed by lethal injection for the murder of Whelette Collins. He was pronounced dead at 2:12 a.m. His last meal consisted of four pieces of Kentucky Fried Chicken, a Mountain Dew, and a Pepsi. Smith requested that Collins's mother personally execute him, by operating the machine that would administer the lethal injection. He supposedly requested this as a way of atoning for his crime, however, the request was denied.

See also
 Capital punishment in North Carolina
 Capital punishment in the United States
 List of people executed in North Carolina
 List of white defendants executed for killing a black victim
 Race and capital punishment in the United States

References

1957 births
1995 deaths
20th-century executions by North Carolina
20th-century executions of American people
American people executed for murder
American people convicted of kidnapping
American people convicted of rape
People convicted of murder by North Carolina
People executed by North Carolina by lethal injection
Violence against women in the United States